Reginald Harry Barlow (June 17, 1866 – July 6, 1943) was an American stage and screen character actor, author, and film director. He was a busy performer in Hollywood films of the 1930s.

Early life

A native of Cambridge, Massachusetts, and son of the old-time minstrel, Milt G. Barlow (1843–1904), Barlow made his stage debut at the age of twelve in his father's minstrel troupe of Barlow, Wilson, Primrose, and West.

Barlow joined the 2nd (Special Service) Battalion of The Royal Canadian Regiment on October 22, 1899, for service in South Africa during the Second Boer War. According to newspaper and other accounts, he did also serve in the United States Army during the Spanish–American War and World War I, and eventually rose to the rank of full colonel in 1923.

Barlow had thoughts of quitting the stage for the church in 1908 and at the time remarked to an interviewer: "All my ancestors have been soldiers, actors, and ministers, and some of them all three. I am a direct descendant of Bishop Barlow of the days of Henry VIII."

Career

A distinguished-looking actor who lent an air of dignity to any role he played, in the early part of his stage career he landed leading roles in The Silver King, Monte Cristo, The Sign of the Cross, Old Lady 31, and The Little Princess.

Among his early silent films were The Cinema Murder (1919), the post World War I drama Love's Flame in which he plays the father-in-law: "M. De Ronsard", and in the comedy Clothes Make the Pirate (1925) in which he plays "Captain Montague", a cameo. After the changeover to sound, Barlow usually played men of means, such as military officers, senators, and bankers, turning up as a  college professor in Horse Feathers (1932), with the Marx Brothers, a chaplain in Ann Vickers (1933), the sheriff in Tower of London (1939), and the Professor Warwick ostracizing mad scientist George Zucco in The Mad Monster (1942).

Further, as the American Legion Hollywood Post 43 was often included in the older films without giving any actual credit as to which members of the Post were actually shown within the films, its highly likely that Barlow did also often appear in films as an uncredited member of Hollywood Post 43.

Director
Barlow functioned as a director of play companies before switching over to film. He was director of the Wright Huntington Players, narrated for the Eveready Hour, and on at least one occasion directed a film itself. It appears Barlow did play a director's sort of role in several films much as did Alfred Hitchcock, who was known to have made at least a cameo appearance in every one of his films. His film The Toy Maker of Leyden (1915) is listed as The Magic Toy Maker in Hanson & Givenson, eds. American Film Institute Catalogue Index, vol. F1, 1911–1920.

Family
Barlow married at least two times, but he did say on the 1930 Census that he was 22 years old at his first marriage. He married Clare Danforth, on April 15, 1902, in Charleston, Missouri. This "marriage", however, was subsequently refuted by the family of Bertha Merkel, infra, and was apparently an extortion attempt.

He married Milwaukee heiress Bertha Merkel (aka: Selma Rose), the daughter of George and Mary Merkel, on August 6, 1903, in Los Angeles, California, and to whom he remained married until her death in 1933. He later married Carol Brown (of Pasadena, California), to whom he was married at the time of his death, according to his death certificate and according to the Los Angeles Times of 1934 when he married Carol in Tijuana, Mexico.

Scandals

On August 21, 1903, the Chicago Inter Ocean reported that Barlow had committed bigamy. According to Barlow's first wife, who claimed that he married her under the pseudonym Livingston, the couple were not divorced at the time of his second marriage to Bertha Merkel. However, the Los Angeles Times subsequently published an article on August 28, 1903, which completely exhonorated Barlow, who had just recently converted to Catholicism in order to marry Bertha, of any wrongdoing. It was actually Barlow's new mother-in-law, Mary Merkel, who had earlier initiated an investigation and upon discovery, prosecution of Barlow, which of course never happened.

Filmography

Actor 

 Monsieur Lecoq (1915) - Otto, the Duke's Valet
 The Cinema Murder (1919) - Power's 'Man Friday'
 Love's Flame (1920) - Monsieur De Rosard
 Clothes Make the Pirate (1925) - Captain Montague
 The Sin of Madelon Claudet (1931) - Public Assistance Official (uncredited)
 Are These Our Children? (1931) - Judge (uncredited)
 Mata Hari (1931) - Prosecutor (uncredited)
 This Reckless Age (1932) - Lester Bell
 The Woman from Monte Carlo (1932) - Defense Attorney
 Alias the Doctor (1932) - The Professor (uncredited)
 The Wet Parade (1932) - Judge Brandon
 The World and the Flesh (1932) - Markov
 Night Court (1932) - District Attorney Grant (uncredited)
 State's Attorney (1932) - Last Trial Judge (uncredited)
 Sinners in the Sun (1932) - Mr. Blake
 As You Desire Me (1932) - Dr. Reinhardt (uncredited)
 The Washington Masquerade (1932) - Sen. Withers
 Skyscraper Souls (1932) - Brewster's Associate (uncredited)
 Horse Feathers (1932) - Retiring Collage President (uncredited)
 Speak Easily (1932) - Billington (uncredited)
 The Age of Consent (1932) - Mr. Swale - Dora's father
 The All American (1932) - Bank President
 I Am a Fugitive from a Chain Gang (1932) - Mr. Parker (uncredited)
 Evenings for Sale (1932) - Mr. Meyer (uncredited)
 Afraid to Talk (1932) - Judge MacMurray
 If I Had a Million (1932) - Otto K. Bullwinkle (uncredited)
 Rasputin and the Empress (1932) - General Who Underestimated the Japanese (uncredited)
 Parachute Jumper (1933) - The Colonel (uncredited)
 Goldie Gets Along (1933) - Uncle Saunders (uncredited)
 Grand Slam (1933) - Theodore (uncredited)
 King Kong (1933) - Ship's Engineer (uncredited)
 Fast Workers (1933) - Judge (uncredited)
 The Big Cage (1933) - John Whipple
 His Private Secretary (1933) - Mr. Wallace
 Midnight Mary (1933) - Trial Judge (uncredited)
 Doctor Bull (1933) - Supporter #1 for Dr. Bull (uncredited)
 Ann Vickers (1933) - Chaplain
 Day of Reckoning (1933) - Judge (uncredited)
 Flying Down to Rio (1933) - The Banker
 You Can't Buy Everything (1934) - Mr. Tom Sparks
 The Cat and the Fiddle (1934) - King's Aide in Show (uncredited)
 Half a Sinner (1934) - Sheriff John King
 Operator 13 (1934) - Col. Storm (uncredited)
 Stamboul Quest (1934) - German Officer (uncredited)
 Beyond the Law (1934) - Judge
 One Night of Love (1934) - Stage Manager (uncredited)
 Great Expectations (1934) - Judge (uncredited)
 Cheating Cheaters (1934) - Police Captain (uncredited)
 Romance in Manhattan (1935) - Customs Inspector
 The Gilded Lily (1935) - Managing Editor (uncredited)
 Mutiny Ahead (1935) - Captain Martin
 A Dog of Flanders (1935) - Official with Court Order (uncredited)
 Les Misérables (1935) - Henri (uncredited)
 Cardinal Richelieu (1935) - Agitator
 Bride of Frankenstein (1935) - Hans
 Red Blood of Courage (1935) - Mark Henry / Pete Drago
 Strangers All (1935) - Judge
 Werewolf of London (1935) - Timothy, Falden Caretaker (uncredited)
 Hooray for Love (1935) - Doug's Lawyer (uncredited)
 The Last Days of Pompeii (1935) - The Janitor of the Slave Market (uncredited)
 Captain Blood (1935) - Dixon (uncredited)
 White Lies (1935) - Judge (uncredited)
 I Dream Too Much (1935)
 A Tale of Two Cities (1935)
 Little Lord Fauntleroy (1936) - Newick
 O'Malley of the Mounted (1936) - Commissioner
 The Girl from Mandalay (1936) - Dr. Collins
 The Last of the Mohicans (1936) - Duke of Newcastle
 Lloyd's of London (1936) - Second Captain
 The Great Barrier (1937) - James Hill - Member of C.P.R. Board
 The Road Back (1937) - Manager (uncredited)
 The Toast of New York (1937) - Mr. Taylor - Hotel Proprietor (uncredited)
 Saturday's Heroes (1937) - History Professor (uncredited)
 Thoroughbreds Don't Cry (1937) - Man Seated Behind Mr. Sloan (uncredited)
 The Adventures of Marco Polo (1938) - Giuseppi - Venetian Business Man (uncredited)
 Mysterious Mr. Moto (1938) - Policeman (uncredited)
 Daredevils of the Red Circle (1939) - Doctor in Hospital [Ch. 1] (uncredited)
 Heritage of the Desert (1939) - Judge Stevens
 The Man in the Iron Mask (1939) - Jean Paul
 Colorado Sunset (1939) - Dairyman Casey (uncredited)
 Wall Street Cowboy (1939) - Bainbridge
 New Frontier (1939) - Judge Bill Lawson
 Dick Tracy's G-Men (1939) - Dr. Alfred Guttenbach (uncredited)
 The Witness Vanishes (1939) - Sir John Digby
 Rovin' Tumbleweeds (1939) - Higgins - a Migrant
 Tower of London (1939) - Sherriff (uncredited)
 The Courageous Dr. Christian (1940) - Sam
 Scotland Yard (1941) - Messenger (uncredited)
 The Mad Monster (1942) - Professor Warwick
 Syncopation (1942) - Hobo Reading Paper (uncredited)
 The Mayor of 44th Street (1942) - Watchman (uncredited)
 Law of the Northwest (1943) - Jean Darcy (final film role)

Notes
 1 Confer Los Angeles Times, Friday Morning, 14 Sep 1934, Part I, p. 15, col. 2, article: "Reginald Barlow to Play Lead in 'Blood on Moon'." The article clearly states that he "began his theatrical career at the age of 12 in his father's troupe."

 2 See Bunches of Barlows link which clearly shows Reginald, a confirmed member of the American Legion Hollywood Post 43, to be a Colonel. The picture there also shows him presenting Shirley Temple with a certificate as a new "Honorary Colonel" in 1935. The same website also shows that in the New York Times of 7 July 1943, Reginald Barlow was a Colonel who commanded the 304th Infantry in World War I for the United States, and was a veteran of two other wars: the Spanish–American War and The Second Boer War.

 3 See also: Keffer, History of San Fernando Valley (1934), pp. 118–120; where it in fact states that Barlow commanded the 302nd Infantry as a Major, and then was later given the command of the 349th as a Lieutenant-Colonel during World War I.

 4 Confer Los Angeles Daily Times, Friday, 28 Aug 1903, p. 4, cols. 3–4, article: "Actor Barlow's Wife".

Citations
 Los Angeles Daily Times, Monday, 10 Aug 1903, p. 9, col. 1, article: "Lost Heart on Pullman"
 Los Angeles Sunday Times, 23 Aug 1903, p. 4, cols. 6–7, article: "Bride's Momma After Actor Reggie Barlow"
 Los Angeles Daily Times, Friday, 28 Aug 1903, p. 4, cols. 3–4, article: "Actor Barlow's Wife"
 The Stars and Stripes, Vol 1, No 50, France, Friday, 17 Jan 1919, p. 2, col. 4, article: "Show Each Night, Plan of Biggest Booking Agency"
 Los Angeles Times, Friday Morning, 14 Sep 1934, Part I, p. 15, col. 2, article: "Reginald Barlow to Play Lead in 'Blood on Moon'."
 New York Times, Wednesday, 7 Jul 1943, p. 19, col. 3, article: "R. Barlow is Dead; Actor and Soldier"
 Frank M. Keffer, History of San Fernando Valley (1934), R 979.41 L88Ke, pp. 118–120, bio entitled: "Col. Reginald Barlow"
 Variety, 14 Jul 1943, article: "Obituaries, Reginald Barlow"

References

External links

 
 
 
 South African War Service Records of 7012 LCpl R.H. Barlow of The Royal Canadian Regiment

American male film actors
American male silent film actors
Male actors from Cambridge, Massachusetts
Male actors from Los Angeles
Vaudeville performers
1866 births
1943 deaths
Royal Canadian Regiment soldiers
19th-century American male actors
American male stage actors
20th-century American male actors
Military personnel from Massachusetts
Canadian military personnel of the Second Boer War
United States Army personnel of World War I
United States Army colonels
American military personnel of the Spanish–American War